The International Dialogue on Population and Sustainable Development is an annual international conference that has been held in Berlin since 2002, organised by the German Foundation for World Population, Deutsche Gesellschaft für Internationale Zusammenarbeit (GIZ) GmbH, International Planned Parenthood Federation (IPPF), KfW Entwicklungsbank in close cooperation with the Federal Ministry for Economic Cooperation and Development and Development (BMZ), Bayer AG.

It is a attended by specialists from different regions who advocate for sexual and reproductive health and rights (SRHR) and population dynamics for achieving the 2030 Agenda on Sustainable Development and the Sustainable Development Goals.

The conference focuses on the exchange of best practice, information, experience, and networking of attendees. It is intended as a forum to discuss issues related to SRHR and population dynamics.

The 2019 conference emphasises the mutual relationship between universal health coverage (UHC) and SRHR for all, through the inclusion of UHC in the Sustainable Development Goals.

References

Population concern advocacy groups
Annual events in Berlin
2002 establishments in Germany